Surgeon General  Sir James Mouat  (14 April 1815 – 4 January 1899) was an English recipient of the Victoria Cross, the highest and most prestigious award for gallantry in the face of the enemy that can be awarded to British and Commonwealth forces.

Details
Mouat was 39 years old, and a Surgeon in the 6th (Inniskilling) Dragoons, British Army, during the Crimean War when the following deed took place on 26 October 1854 in the Crimea, at Balaklava, for which he was awarded the VC.

Surgeon Mouat went with Corporal Charles Wooden to the assistance of an officer who was lying seriously wounded in an exposed position, after the retreat of the Light Cavalry. He dressed the officer's wounds under heavy fire from the enemy, and by stopping a severe haemorrhage, helped to save his life.

His citation reads:

The medal
His Victoria Cross is displayed at the Army Medical Services Museum in Mytchett, Surrey.

Family
Mouat married, in 1869, Adela-Rose-Ellen, daughter of Rev Nicholas Tindal, rector of Sandhurst, Gloucestershire, and granddaughter of Sir Nicolas Conyngham Tindal, Chief Justice of the Common Pleas from 1829 to 1845.

Footnotes

References 
 "Testimony to the reality of the Mesmeric Phenomena in University College Hospital, by Mr. James Mouat, Army Surgeon", The Zoist: A Journal of Cerebral Physiology & Mesmerism, and Their Applications to Human Welfare, Vol.7, No.25, (April 1849), pp. 41–44.
 RAMC Journal
 "The emerging office of the Surgeon General", Lieutenant Colonel Robert L Pearce, Australian Defence Force Health Journal, April 2002
 Location of grave and VC medal (Kensal Green Cemetery)

British recipients of the Victoria Cross
Crimean War recipients of the Victoria Cross
British Army personnel of the Crimean War
Knights Commander of the Order of the Bath
6th (Inniskilling) Dragoons officers
British military personnel of the New Zealand Wars
Chevaliers of the Légion d'honneur
English surgeons
People from Chatham, Kent
1815 births
1899 deaths
Burials at Kensal Green Cemetery
British Army regimental surgeons
44th Regiment of Foot officers
King's Own Royal Regiment officers
Royal Norfolk Regiment officers
British Army recipients of the Victoria Cross